The Piper Islands National Park is a national park in Far North Queensland, Australia.  It lies 1977 km northwest of Brisbane.  It comprises four small islands lying on the inner northern Great Barrier Reef off the eastern coast of the Cape York Peninsula in Temple Bay, between Cape Grenville and Fair Cape.

Birds
The islands have been identified by BirdLife International as an Important Bird Area (IBA) because they have supported over 1% of the world populations of pied imperial pigeons (with up to 4000 nests) and black noddies (up to 7500 nests).

Islands
 Baird Island (1 ha) – coral and shingle cay with mangroves (dominated by Rhizophora stylosa and Avicennia marina) growing to a canopy height of 5 m
 Beesley Island (2.4 ha) – cay with grasses and herbs, sharing the same reef as Baird Island
 Farmer Island (7 ha) – cay with a grass and shrub exterior and a wooded interior dominated by Pisonia grandis forest up to 4 m in height
 Fisher Island (3 ha) – coral shingle cay with shrubs and mangroves, sharing the same reef as Fisher Island

See also
 Protected areas of Queensland

References

External links
 Piper Islands National Park - State of Queensland Department of National Parks, Sport and Racing

National parks of Far North Queensland
Protected areas established in 1989
1989 establishments in Australia
Important Bird Areas of Queensland
Islands on the Great Barrier Reef
Coral Sea Islands
Islands of Far North Queensland